Rivière-Patapédia-Est is an unorganized territory in the Bas-Saint-Laurent region of Quebec, Canada.

It is named after the East Patapedia River that forms the territory's western boundary. This river is the main outlet of Lake Supérieur and a tributary of the Patapédia River.

Demographics
Population trend:
 Population in 2011: 0
 Population in 2006: 0
 Population in 2001: 0
 Population in 1996: 0
 Population in 1991: 0

See also
 List of unorganized territories in Quebec

References

Unorganized territories in Bas-Saint-Laurent
La Matapédia Regional County Municipality